The statue of the Earl Kitchener is an outdoor bronze statue by John Tweed depicting Herbert Kitchener, 1st Earl Kitchener, installed in 1926 and located on the south side of Horse Guards Parade in London, United Kingdom. The sculpture stands on a Portland stone plinth. It became a Grade II listed building in 1970. 

Calls for a national memorial to Kitchener began immediately after his death, but there were considerable delays while a suitable site was located, with suggestions including Grosvenor Gardens, or St Paul's Cathedral, or the Royal Exchange, before the Office of Works and King George V approved a site on the south side of Horse Guards Parade, next to the north wall of the Garden of 10 and 11 Downing Street.  The project was entrusted to sculptor John Tweed and architect Reginald Blomfield, but Blomfield withdrew when his proposal for a tall plinth, raising the statue above the wall, was rejected by the Prime Minister Lloyd George on grounds of cost. 

Tweed's larger than life size bronze statue was cast by A. B. Burton at his Thames Ditton Foundry. It portrays Kitchener in his army uniform, with bare head, standing with left foot advanced, and hands clasped.  The statue contrasts with the equestrian statues of Field Marshal Wolseley and Field Marshal Roberts that had already been installed on the east side of Horse Guards Parade in 1920 and 1924 respectively.  

The statue is mounted on a Portland stone base and platform, facing north across Horse Guards Parade.  The plinth contains the following inscription: KITCHENER/ 1850–1916/ ERECTED BY PARLIAMENT.  Behind the statue is a stone screen, against the north face of the wall of the Garden of 10 and 11 Downing Street.

The memorial was unveiled on 9 June 1926 by the Prince of Wales (later Edward VIII).  It was favourably compared with a similar standing statue of General Gordon, which stood in Trafalgar Square from 1888 to 1943, and was reinstalled at Victoria Embankment Gardens in 1953.

Notes

References
 Statue of Lord Kitchener, National Heritage List for England, Historic England
 Field Marshal Earl Kitchener, War Memorials Register, Imperial War Museums
 "Haig and Kitchener in Twentieth-Century Britain: Remembrance, Representation and Appropriation", Stephen Heathorn, Routledge, 2016, pages 46-51
 Prince Of Wales Unveils Kitchener Statue 1926, British Pathé

External links

 Statue of Lord Kitchener of Khartoum, The Courtauld Institute of Art
 Upcoming, @ Kitchener Statue on Horse Guards Parade (2014), The Kitchener Scholars Association

1926 establishments in the United Kingdom
1926 sculptures
Bronze sculptures in the United Kingdom
Cultural depictions of Herbert Kitchener, 1st Earl Kitchener
Kitchener
Grade II listed monuments and memorials
Military memorials in London
Outdoor sculptures in London
Kitchener
Kitchener
Kitchener
Whitehall